This is a list of French television related events from 1981.

Events
8 March - Jean Gabilou is selected to represent France at the 1981 Eurovision Song Contest with his song "Humanahum". He is selected to be the twenty-fifth French Eurovision entry during a national final.

Debuts

Television shows

1940s
Le Jour du Seigneur (1949–present)

1960s
Les Dossiers de l'écran (1967-1991)
Les Animaux du monde (1969-1990)
Alain Decaux raconte (1969-1987)

1970s
Aujourd'hui Madame (1970-1982)
30 millions d'amis (1976-2016)
Les Jeux de 20 Heures (1976-1987)
1, rue Sésame (1978-1982)

1980s
Julien Fontanes, magistrat (1980-1989)
Dimanche Martin

Ending this year

Births
10 February - Natasha St-Pier, Canadian-born singer & TV personality
16 March - Vincent Cerutti, TV & radio presenter
22 April - Virginie de Clausade, actress & TV & radio presenter

Deaths

See also
1981 in France
List of French films of 1981